The Hambleton Peninsula lies within the reservoir Rutland Water, in Rutland, England. When the Gwash Valley was dammed in 1975, the area surrounding what was then a ridge were submerged, including a small number of properties in the hamlets of Nether Hambleton and Middle Hambleton. The village of Upper Hambleton survived, and now sits on the peninsula, which is some 3500 metres in length and 1000 metres in width.

The area of the peninsula lies in the parish of Hambleton with the exception of a small detached area of Exton parish on the north shore.

The Hambleton Peninsula and its surroundings feature heavily in British author Robert Goddard´s fictional mystery thriller Set in Stone (1999).

References

Landforms of Rutland
Peninsulas of England